The Oahu moa-nalo (Thambetochen xanion) is one of two species of moa-nalo in the genus Thambetochen. Moa-nalo are a group of extinct, flightless, large goose-like ducks, which evolved in the Hawaiian Islands of the North Pacific Ocean.

Etymology
The specific epithet comes from the Greek xanion (“comb”), referring to the bony, tooth-like projections on the jaws.

Distribution
The species was described in 1991 from subfossil material collected by Storrs Olson, Helen James, Aki Sinoto and Eric Komori, from Barbers Point on the island of Oahu. Remains of the bird have also been recovered from Ulupau Head on the same island. It was smaller and less robust than its only congener, the Maui Nui large-billed moa-nalo.

References

Anatinae
Late Quaternary prehistoric birds
Holocene extinctions
Extinct birds of Hawaii
Extinct flightless birds
Biota of Oahu
Birds described in 1991
O'ahu moa-nalo
O'ahu moa-nalo